The Nunavut Court of Appeal (NUCA; , Inuinnaqtun: Nunavunmi Apiqhuidjutainut Uuktuffaarutit) is the highest appellate court in the Canadian territory of Nunavut. 

Its positions consist of ex officio justices from the Nunavut Court of Justice, the territorial courts of Yukon and the Northwest Territories, and the Court of Appeal of Alberta. The Chief Justice of Alberta, currently Catherine Fraser, also serves as the Chief Justice of the Nunavut Court of Appeal.

References

External links
 

Nunavut courts
1999 establishments in Nunavut
Courts and tribunals established in 1999
Nunavut